This list of the mammal species recorded in Algeria provides information about the status of the 120 mammal species occurring in Algeria. Three are critically endangered, two are endangered, ten are vulnerable, and three are near threatened.

The following tags are used to highlight each species' conservation status as assessed on the IUCN Red List:

Order: Macroscelidea (elephant shrews)

Often called sengis, the elephant shrews or jumping shrews are native to southern Africa. Their common English name derives from their elongated flexible snout and their resemblance to the true shrews.
Family: Macroscelididae (elephant shrews)
Genus: Petrosaltator
 North African elephant shrew, P. rozeti

Order: Hyracoidea (hyraxes)

The hyraxes are any of four species of fairly small, thickset, herbivorous mammals in the order Hyracoidea. About the size of a domestic cat they are well-furred, with rounded bodies and a stumpy tail. They are native to Africa and the Middle East.

Family: Procaviidae (hyraxes)
Genus: Procavia
 Cape hyrax, P. capensis

Order: Primates

The order Primates contains humans and their closest relatives: lemurs, lorisoids, tarsiers, monkeys, and apes.
Suborder: Haplorhini
Infraorder: Simiiformes
Parvorder: Catarrhini
Superfamily: Cercopithecoidea
Family: Cercopithecidae (Old World monkeys)
Genus: Macaca
 Barbary macaque, M. sylvanus

Order: Rodentia (rodents)

Rodents make up the largest order of mammals, with over 40 percent of mammalian species. They have two incisors in the upper and lower jaw which grow continually and must be kept short by gnawing. Most rodents are small though the capybara can weigh up to 45 kg (100 lb).
Suborder: Hystricomorpha
Family: Hystricidae (Old World porcupines)
Genus: Hystrix
 Crested porcupine, Hystrix cristata 
Family: Ctenodactylidae
Genus: Ctenodactylus
 Common gundi, Ctenodactylus gundi 
 Val's gundi, Ctenodactylus vali 
Genus: Massoutiera
 Mzab gundi, Massoutiera mzabi 
Suborder: Sciurognathi
Family: Sciuridae (squirrels)
Subfamily: Xerinae
Genus: Atlantoxerus
 Barbary ground squirrel, Atlantoxerus getulus 
Family: Gliridae (dormice)
Subfamily: Leithiinae
Genus: Eliomys
 Asian garden dormouse, Eliomys melanurus 
 Maghreb garden dormouse, Eliomys munbyanus 
Family: Dipodidae (jerboas)
Subfamily: Dipodinae
Genus: Jaculus
 Lesser Egyptian jerboa, Jaculus jaculus 
 Greater Egyptian jerboa, Jaculus orientalis 
Family: Muridae (mice, rats, voles, gerbils, hamsters, etc.)
Subfamily: Deomyinae
Genus: Acomys
 Seurat's spiny mouse, Acomys seurati 
Subfamily: Gerbillinae
Genus: Dipodillus
 North African gerbil, Dipodillus campestris 
Genus: Gerbillus
 Lesser Egyptian gerbil, Gerbillus gerbillus 
 Pygmy gerbil, Gerbillus henleyi 
 Balochistan gerbil, Gerbillus nanus 
 Lesser short-tailed gerbil, Gerbillus simoni 
 Tarabul's gerbil, Gerbillus tarabuli 
Genus: Meriones
 Sundevall's jird, Meriones crassus 
 Libyan jird, Meriones libycus 
 Shaw's jird, Meriones shawi 
Genus: Pachyuromys
 Fat-tailed gerbil, Pachyuromys duprasi 
Genus: Psammomys
 Fat sand rat, Psammomys obesus 
 Thin sand rat, Psammomys vexillaris 
Subfamily: Murinae
Genus: Apodemus
 Wood mouse, Apodemus sylvaticus 
Genus: Lemniscomys
 Barbary striped grass mouse, Lemniscomys barbarus 
Genus: Mus
 Algerian mouse, Mus spretus

Order: Lagomorpha (lagomorphs)

The lagomorphs comprise two families, Leporidae (hares and rabbits), and Ochotonidae (pikas). Though they can resemble rodents, and were classified as a superfamily in that order until the early 20th century, they have since been considered a separate order. They differ from rodents in a number of physical characteristics, such as having four incisors in the upper jaw rather than two.

Family: Leporidae (rabbits, hares)
Genus: Oryctolagus
 European rabbit, Oyctolagus cuniculus 
Genus: Lepus
 Cape hare, Lepus capensis 
 African savanna hare, Lepus victoriae

Order: Erinaceomorpha (hedgehogs and gymnures)

The order Erinaceomorpha contains a single family, Erinaceidae, which comprise the hedgehogs and gymnures. The hedgehogs are easily recognised by their spines while gymnures look more like large rats.
Family: Erinaceidae (hedgehogs)
Subfamily: Erinaceinae
Genus: Atelerix
 North African hedgehog, Atelerix algirus 
Genus: Hemiechinus
 Desert hedgehog, Hemiechinus aethiopicus

Order: Soricomorpha (shrews, moles, and solenodons)

The "shrew-forms" are insectivorous mammals. The shrews and solenodons closely resemble mice while the moles are stout-bodied burrowers.
Family: Soricidae (shrews)
Subfamily: Crocidurinae
Genus: Crocidura
 Mauritanian shrew, Crocidura lusitania 
 Greater white-toothed shrew, Crocidura russula 
 Whitaker's shrew, Crocidura whitakeri 
Genus: Suncus
 Etruscan shrew, Suncus etruscus

Order: Chiroptera (bats)

The bats' most distinguishing feature is that their forelimbs are developed as wings, making them the only mammals capable of flight. Bat species account for about 20% of all mammals.
Family: Vespertilionidae
Subfamily: Myotinae
Genus: Myotis
 Long-fingered bat, Myotis capaccinii 
 Geoffroy's bat, Myotis emarginatus 
 Felten's myotis, Myotis punicus 
Subfamily: Vespertilioninae
Genus: Eptesicus
 Serotine bat, Eptesicus serotinus 
Genus: Hypsugo
 Savi's pipistrelle, Hypsugo savii 
Genus: Nyctalus
 Greater noctule bat, Nyctalus lasiopterus 
 Lesser noctule, Nyctalus leisleri 
Genus: Otonycteris
 Desert long-eared bat, Otonycteris hemprichii 
Genus: Pipistrellus
 Egyptian pipistrelle, Pipistrellus deserti 
 Kuhl's pipistrelle, Pipistrellus kuhlii 
 Common pipistrelle, Pipistrellus pipistrellus 
 Rüppell's pipistrelle, Pipistrellus rueppelli 
Subfamily: Miniopterinae
Genus: Miniopterus
Common bent-wing bat, M. schreibersii 
Family: Rhinopomatidae
Genus: Rhinopoma
 Egyptian mouse-tailed bat, R. cystops 
 Lesser mouse-tailed bat, Rhinopoma hardwickei 
 Greater mouse-tailed bat, Rhinopoma microphyllum 
Family: Molossidae
Genus: Tadarida
 Egyptian free-tailed bat, Tadarida aegyptiaca 
 European free-tailed bat, Tadarida teniotis 
Family: Emballonuridae
Genus: Taphozous
 Naked-rumped tomb bat, Taphozous nudiventris 
Family: Rhinolophidae
Subfamily: Rhinolophinae
Genus: Asellia
Trident leaf-nosed bat, A. tridens 
Genus: Rhinolophus
Blasius's horseshoe bat, R. blasii 
 Geoffroy's horseshoe bat, Rhinolophus clivosus 
 Mediterranean horseshoe bat, Rhinolophus euryale 
 Greater horseshoe bat, Rhinolophus ferrumequinum 
 Lesser horseshoe bat, Rhinolophus hipposideros 
 Mehely's horseshoe bat, Rhinolophus mehelyi

Order: Cetacea (whales)

The order Cetacea includes whales, dolphins and porpoises. They are the mammals most fully adapted to aquatic life with a spindle-shaped nearly hairless body, protected by a thick layer of blubber, and forelimbs and tail modified to provide propulsion underwater.

Suborder: Mysticeti
Family: Balaenidae (right whales)
Genus: Eubalaena
 North Atlantic right whale, E. glacialis  vagrant
Family: Balaenopteridae (rorqual)
Subfamily: Megapterinae
Genus: Megaptera
 Humpback whale, M. novaeangliae 
Genus: Balaenoptera
 Common minke whale, Balaenoptera acutorostrata 
 Fin whale, Balaenoptera physalus 
Suborder: Odontoceti
Superfamily: Platanistoidea
Family: Delphinidae (marine dolphins)
Genus: Steno
 Rough-toothed dolphin, S. bredanensis 
Genus: Delphinus
 Short-beaked common dolphin, D. delphis 
Genus: Orcinus
 Orca, Orcinus orca 
Genus: Pseudorca 
 False killer whale, Pseudorca crassidens 
Genus: Globicephala
 Long-finned pilot whale, Globicephala melas 
Genus: Grampus 
 Risso's dolphin, Grampus griseus 
Genus: Stenella 
 Striped dolphin, Stenella coeruleoalba 
Genus Tursiops
 Common bottlenose dolphin, Tursiops truncatus 
Family Physeteridae (sperm whales)
Genus: Physeter
 Sperm whale, Physeter macrocephalus 
Superfamily Ziphioidea (beaked whales) 
Family Ziphidae
Genus: Ziphius
Cuvier's beaked whale, Ziphius cavirostris

Order: Carnivora (carnivorans)

There are over 260 species of carnivorans, the majority of which eat meat. They have a characteristic skull shape and dentition. 
Suborder: Feliformia
Family: Felidae (cats)
Subfamily: Felinae
Genus: Acinonyx
Cheetah, A. jubatus 
Northwest African cheetah, A. j. hecki 
Genus: Caracal
Caracal, C. caracal 
Genus: Felis
African wildcat, F. lybica 
Sand cat, F. margarita 
Genus: Leptailurus
 Serval, L. serval  possibly extirpated
Subfamily: Pantherinae
Genus: Panthera	
 Leopard, P. pardus 
 African leopard, P. p. pardus 
Family: Viverridae
Subfamily: Viverrinae
Genus: Genetta
 Common genet, G. genetta 
Family: Herpestidae (mongooses)
Genus: Herpestes
 Egyptian mongoose, H. ichneumon 
Family: Hyaenidae (hyaenas)
Genus: Crocuta
 Spotted hyena, C. crocuta  possibly extirpated
Genus: Hyaena
 Striped hyena, H. hyaena 
Suborder: Caniformia
Family: Canidae (dogs, foxes)
Genus: Canis
African golden wolf, C. lupaster 
Genus: Lycaon
 African wild dog, L. pictus  presence uncertain
Genus: Vulpes
 Rüppell's fox, V. rueppelli 
 Red fox, V. vulpes 
 Fennec fox, V. zerda 
Family: Mustelidae (mustelids)
Genus: Ictonyx
 Saharan striped polecat, I. libyca 
Genus: Lutra
 European otter, L. lutra 
Genus: Mellivora
 Honey badger, M. capensis 
Genus: Mustela
Least weasel, M. nivalis 
Family: Phocidae (earless seals)
Genus: Monachus
 Mediterranean monk seal, M. monachus  presence uncertain

Order: Artiodactyla (even-toed ungulates)

The even-toed ungulates are ungulates whose weight is borne about equally by the third and fourth toes, rather than mostly or entirely by the third as in perissodactyls. There are about 220 artiodactyl species, including many that are of great economic importance to humans.
Family: Suidae (pigs)
Subfamily: Suinae
Genus: Sus
 Wild boar, S. scrofa 
Family: Cervidae (deer)
Subfamily: Cervinae
Genus: Cervus
 Red deer, C. elaphus 
 Barbary stag, C. e. barbarus 
Genus: Dama
 Fallow deer, D. dama  introduced
Family: Bovidae (cattle, antelope, sheep, goats)
Subfamily: Antilopinae
Genus: Gazella
Cuvier's gazelle, G. cuvieri 
Dorcas gazelle, G. dorcas 
Rhim gazelle, G. leptoceros 
Genus: Nanger
 Dama gazelle, N. dama  possibly extirpated
Subfamily: Caprinae
Genus: Ammotragus
 Barbary sheep, A. lervia

Extinct 
The following species are locally extinct in the country:
 Addax, Addax nasomaculatus
 Hartebeest, Alcelaphus buselaphus
 Aurochs, Bos primigenius
 North African elephant, Loxodonta africana pharaohensis
 Red gazelle, Eudorcas rufina
 Hippopotamus, Hippopotamus amphibius
 Scimitar oryx, Oryx dammah
 Lion, Panthera leo
 Brown bear, Ursus arctos

See also
List of chordate orders
Lists of mammals by region
Mammal classification

References

External links

Algeria
Mammals

Algeria